Chulcheh (also Romanized as Chūlcheh; also known as Choldzhekh and Chūleh) is a village in Ijrud-e Pain Rural District, Halab District, Ijrud County, Zanjan Province, Iran. At the 2006 census, its population was 90, in 23 families.

References 

Populated places in Ijrud County